Peterton is an unincorporated community in Osage County, Kansas, United States.

History
A post office was opened in Peterton in 1876, and remained in operation until it was discontinued in 1904.

References

Further reading

External links
 Osage County maps: Current, Historic, KDOT

Unincorporated communities in Osage County, Kansas
Unincorporated communities in Kansas